The Roman Catholic Archdiocese of Accra covers the Greater Accra Region and parts of the Volta Region. There are 62 parishes and rectories. The Roman Catholic Archdiocese of Accra is the Metropolitan See for the ecclesiastical province of Accra in Ghana which includes the suffragan dioceses of Ho, Koforidua, Jasikan and Keta-Akatsi. The Latin title of the archdiocese is Archidioecesis Accraënsis, and the corporate title is Archdiocese of Accra. The cathedral parish for the archdiocese is the Holy Spirit Cathedral.

Most Reverend Dominic Kodwo Andoh† was the first Ghanaian native to become Archbishop of Accra. Installed in October 1971, he became the 3rd Ordinary for Accra since its establishment as a diocese.

Special churches

The Holy Spirit Cathedral

Sacred Heart Catholic Church 
Sacred Heart Church which was started under a large empty cocoa shed at Derby Avenue in Accra, was the first church to be built. It was dedicated on February 11, 1925.

Bishops
Prefect Apostolic of Accra (Roman rite) 
 Father Adolph Alexander Noser, S.V.D. † (1944 – 1947); see below

Vicar Apostolic of Accra (Roman rite) 
 Bishop Adolph Alexander Noser, S.V.D. † (1947 – 1950); see above & below

Bishops of Accra (Roman rite)
 Bishop Adolph Alexander Noser, S.V.D. † (1950 – 1953), appointed Vicar Apostolic of Alexishafen, Papua New Guinea; future Archbishop; see above
 Bishop Joseph Oliver Bowers † (1953 – 1971)
 Bishop Dominic Kodwo Andoh † (1971 – 1992); see below

Metropolitan Archbishops of Accra (Roman rite)
 Archbishop Dominic Kodwo Andoh † (1992 – 2005); see above
 Archbishop Charles G. Palmer-Buckle (2005 - 2018), appointed Archbishop of Cape Coast
 Archbishop John Bonaventure Kwofie (2019 -)

Auxiliary Bishop
Joseph Oliver Bowers †, S.V.D. (1952-1953), appointed Bishop here

Other priests of this diocese who became bishops
Joseph Kwaku Afrifah-Agyekum (priest here, 1983-1992), appointed Bishop of Koforidua in 2006
Gabriel Charles Palmer-Buckle, appointed Bishop of Koforidua in 1992; later returned here as Archbishop

Suffragan Dioceses
The Metropolitan Archdiocese has four suffragans. In 1992, the Roman Catholic Diocese of Koforidua was carved out of Accra by John Paul II. Accra was elevated to a Metropolitan See and Bishop Andoh was made the Metropolitan Archbishop. While the Ho, Jasikan and Keta-Akatsi Dioceses cover the Volta Region of Ghana, Koforidua Diocese spans a vast area of the Eastern Region.
 Ho 
 Jasikan
 Keta–Akatsi 
 Koforidua

Structure

Deaneries
There are six deaneries in the Archdiocese of Accra. Originally termed as Vicariates or Districts in the 1983 Code of Canon Law, deaneries exist "to foster pastoral care through common action". Each Deanery is headed by a Dean whose duty of promotion and coordination chiefly pertains to his responsibility to oversee and assist in uniting the other presbyters or priests in his vicariate in a common pastoral activity. The six deaneries of Accra are:
 Kaneshie Deanery
 Mamprobi Deanery
 Kpehe Deanery
 Osu Deanery
 Madina Deanery
 Tema- Battor Deanery

Education in the Archdiocese of Accra
In January 1931, the first school was opened on the Sacred Heart Church grounds. With an enrollment of fifteen boys and six girls the school opened and by August it was recognized by the Government Educational Director and placed on the Assisted List (which meant that Government would pay an agreed percentage of the teachers' salaries depending on the quality of the school as determined by the inspectors). Today, Accra Archdiocese has over seventy basic schools, several second cycle schools three seminaries and formation houses and a university.

Catholic Basic Schools in Accra

Public Schools

 Martrys of Uganda R/C Basic-Mamprobi 
 Immaculate Conception Basic-Akweteman
 St. Peter’s R/C Basic-Osu
 Derby Avenue R/C Basic-Derby Avenue
 St. Joseph’s R/C Basic-Adabraka 
 St. Mary’s R/C Basic-Korle-Gonno
 K. G. Boys R/C Basic-Korle Gonno
 St. Francis Xavier R/C Basic-Kotobabi
 St. Paul’s R/C Basic-Kpehe
 St. Kizito R/C Primary-Nima
 St. Kizito R/C ‘1 & 2 JHS-Nima
 Abeka R/C Basic-Abeka
 St. Stephen’s R/C Basic-Darkuman
 Holy Family R/C Basic-Mataheko
 Star of the Sea R/C Basic-Dansoman
 Abossey Okai R/C Basic-Abossey Okai
 Prince of Peace R/C Basic-Kwashieman	
 La Anteson R/C Primary-La
 St. Maurice R/C JHS-La	
 Quaye Nungua R/C Basic-Nungua
 Teshie R/C Basic-Teshie	
 St. Francis R/C Basic-Ashaley Botwe
 Holy Rosary R/C Basic-Adentan	
 Queen of Peace R/C Primary A&B-Madina 
 Queen of Peace R/C JHS A&B-Madina 
 St. Peter Claver R/C KG-Madina 	
 St. Dominic R/C Basic-Taifa
 Immaculate Heart. R/C Basic-Christian Village 	
 Holy Child R/C JHS-Santa Maria	
 St. Joseph the Worker R/C Basic-Weija
 St. Peter’s R/C Basic-Torkuse 
 St. Jude R/C Basic-New-Weija 
 Fr. Henry R/C Basic-Obom
 Papase R/C Basic-Papase
 OLAS R/C JHS-New-Achimota
 OLAS R/C KG & Primary-New-Achimota
 St. Anthony R/C Basic- New Achimota-Fishpond
 St. Slyvanus  R/C Basic-Pokuase
 St. Joseph’s R/C JHS-Amasaman
 Afuaman R/C School Basic-Afuaman
 Natriku R/C Primary-Natriku
 Osuwem R/C Primary-Osuwem
 St. Agnes R/C Primary-Dodowa
 St. Agnes R/C J.H.S.-Dodowa
 Asutsuare R/C Primary-Asutsuare
 Asutsuare R/C JHS-Asutsuare
 Kordiabe R/C Basic-Kordiabe
 Tokpo R/C Basic-Tokpo
 Djorkpo R/C Primary-Djorkpo
 Kadjanya R/C Primary-Kadjanya
 Lubuse R/C Primary-Lubuse
 Ayikuma R/C JHS-Ayikuma	
 St. Dominic Savio R/C Basic-Afienya	
 Ada-Foah R/C Basic-Ada Foah
 St. Peter Claver R/C KG-Ada Foah
 Anyakpor R/C Primary-Anyakpor	
 Korluedor R/C Primary-Korluedor	
 St. Augustine’s R/C Basic-Ashaiman
 Blessed. Clementina R/C Basic-Ashaiman
 St. Peter’s R/C Basic-Tema New-Town
 Archbishop Andoh R/C Basic-Comm. 11 Tema
 Archbishop Andoh R/C KG-Comm. 8 Tema
 St. John Bosco R/C Basic-Comm. 2. Tema
 Holy Child R/C Basic-Sakumono

Catholic Private Basic Schools in Accra	
 St. Bernadette Soubirous School-Dansoman
 Mary Mother of Good Counsel-Airport-West
 St. Theresa’s School-Kaneshie
 Christ The King Int. School-Cantonments
 Bishop Bowers School-Latebiokoshie
 St. Peter Claver French School-Mataheko	
 Corpus Christi-Com. 18 Lashibi
 St. Ignatius R/C School-Batsona
 St. Mark R/C School-Ashongman	
 St. Ancilla Preparatory School-Haatso
 St. John the Evangelist-Adenta

Catholic Second Cycle Schools in Accra

Public Schools

 St. Thomas Aquinas SHS-Cantonment, Accra
 St. Mary’s SHS-Korle-Gonno, Accra
 St. Margaret Mary Sec./Tech-Dansoman, Accra
 Our Lady of Mercy SHS-Tema
 St. Don Bosco Voc. Training Centre-Ashaiman, Tema
 Sacred Heart Technical Inst.-James Town, Accra

Private Schools
 Catholic Social Advance Inst.-Adabraka, Accra
 St. Francis Xavier Sec./Voc.-Kotobabi, Accra
 St. Peter Claver French School-Mataheko, Accra
 Corpus Christi SHS-Lashibi-Comm 18, Tema
 St. Kizito SHS-Battor

Catholic Seminaries and Formation Houses
 St. Paul's Catholic Seminary (Philosophy Session)-Sowutuom
 Society of African Missions (SMA)-Sowutuom
 Salesians of Don Bosco-Ashaiman

Catholic University
 Catholic Institute of Business and Technology (University College)-Adabraka

See also
 Roman Catholicism in Ghana
 List of Roman Catholic dioceses in Ghana

References

Accra
Accra
Accra
Christian organizations established in 1943
A